Tennis events were contested at the 1981 Summer Universiade in Bucharest, Romania.

Medal summary

Medal table

See also
 Tennis at the Summer Universiade

External links
World University Games Tennis on HickokSports.com

1981
Universiade
1981 Summer Universiade